Brij Ke Gopal is an Indian Hindi-language Mythological Television series which was aired on Dangal TV under the banner of Dashmi Creations on 11 April 2022. It stars Paras Arora, Manul Chudasama and Amit Behl in their roles. The show is about the Hindu god Lord Krishna, Radha and Hindu devotee Chaitanya Mahaprabhu. The show ended on 6 June 2022 completing only 48 episodes.

Plot 
Brij Ke Gopal is the first show in India in which the story of Chaitanya Mahaprabhu and Nidhivan has been depicted. The story begins with Krishna and Radha.  And when Chaitanya Mahaprabhu comes to earth looking for Krishna, then Shri Krishna shows Chaitanya the way to Brij. On the same side, Gyandar is the head of the entire Brij Dham. He pretends to do miracles with his divine power. He was actually a dacoit. Long ago, he had changed his disguise and settled in Brij Dham by becoming a fake of Swami in Brij. He had made the people of Brij Dham on his side with his fake miracle. The whole Brij Dham believes that the knowledgeable person is in direct contact with Shri Krishna and were Shri Krishna hears the call of the Dhara of Knowledge. One day Gyandhar performs fake miracles in front of people and the idol of Shri Krishna comes up from the earth and performs miracles. And the land on which the idol of Shri Krishna has been found, he asked for the land to build the temple, he asked for the land. But said there is a poor man and that land was a stream to run his life.  Chaitanya speaks against it and Krishna is in every particle and gives the offerings of worship of Krishna to Gyandhar. Then the knowledgeable person tells him not to take the prasad and see his bundle, he speaks of black magic and troubles him, then Lord Shri Krishna sees this. People on earth are getting away from religion, truth, kindness, that's why Krishna is on earth. But prepares to come and Radha becomes sad then Krishna says that every evening will come to meet Radha in Nidhivan, then Radha says, if even a day does not come, you will always go away forever and never earthly people. Krishna agrees to this condition and takes the form of Gopal on earth and comes to help Chanakya. And save Brij Dham from every misery, difficulty. At the end of the show, Gyandhar becomes a good person.

Cast 
 Paras Arora as Krishna
 Vansh Sayani as Baby Lord Krishna 
 Manul Chudasama as Radha
 Amit Behl as Chaitanya Mahaprabhu
 Pankaj Berry as Gyandhar
 Dhruti Mangeshkar as Lalita
 Gulfam Khan as Sujatha
 Tarun Khanna as Indra
 Nimai Bali as Sahukaar
 Unknown as Sujan   
 Abhay Badoria as Bansi
 Zamin Chaudhary
 Dhruvi Haldankar
 Arna Badoria
 Praneet Bhat as Kantak
 Sonia Singh as Kapoota
 Priya Varlani as Yamuna Devi
 Resham Tipnis as Malati

References 

Indian television series about Hindu deities
Dangal TV original programming
2022 Indian television series debuts
2022 Indian television series endings
Indian television soap operas
Krishna in popular culture